Classic Bike is a UK motorcycle magazine. Launched in 1978, it is noted for coverage of all makes of classic motorcycles, including US and Japanese models, and one-off specials. Previous editors have included Mike Nicks, John Pearson, Phillip Tooth, Brian Crichton and Hugo Wilson. The current (2013) editor is Ben Miller. Under the banner "real bikes for blokes with spanners" it has an emphasis on practical hands-on motorcycling.

Features
As well as special features on classic motorcycles, famous motorcyclists and readers bikes, the magazine has regular features that include:

 Classic World - news, reviews and events in the classic bike market place
 Our Classics - Updates on the classic bikes owned by the editorial team
 Classic America - Mark Gardiner on the US classic bike scene
 Rics Fixes - Rick Parkington explaining how to keep classic bikes running

Notes

External links
 

1978 establishments in the United Kingdom
Bauer Group (UK)
Monthly magazines published in the United Kingdom
Motorcycle magazines published in the United Kingdom
Magazines established in 1978
Mass media in Peterborough